Bocke is a neighborhood of the city of Novi Sad in Serbia.

Geography

Bocke is the westernmost part of Sremska Kamenica, located along the main road that connects Sremska Kamenica with Beočin. It is located between main part of Sremska Kamenica in the east, Ledinci in the south-west, river Danube in the north, and Popovica in the south-east.

Traffic

Bocke neighborhood is connected to the rest of the city by bus line number 71. Bus lines from number 76 to number 84 also passing through the neighborhood.

See also
Neighborhoods of Novi Sad

References
Jovan Mirosavljević, Brevijar ulica Novog Sada 1745-2001, Novi Sad, 2002.
Zoran Rapajić, Novi Sad bez tajni, Beograd, 2002.

External links 

Map of Novi Sad

Novi Sad neighborhoods